Litozamia is a genus of sea snails, marine gastropod mollusks in the subfamily Trophoninae of the family Muricidae, the murex snails or rock snails.

Species
Species within the genus Litozamia include:
 Litozamia acares Houart, 2013
 Litozamia brazieri (Tenison Woods, 1876)
 Litozamia latior (Verco, 1909)
 Litozamia longior (Verco, 1909)
 Litozamia rudolphi (Brazier, 1894)
 Litozamia subtropicalis (Iredale, 1913)
 Litozamia tropis Houart, 1995

References

 Houart, R. (1995). The Trophoninae (Gastropoda: Muricidae) of the New Caledonia region. in: Bouchet, P. (Ed.) Résultats des Campagnes MUSORSTOM 14. Mémoires du Muséum national d'Histoire naturelle. Série A, Zoologie. 167: 459-498

 
Trophoninae